A multi-ringed basin (also a multi-ring impact basin) is not a simple bowl-shaped crater, or a peak ring crater, but one containing multiple concentric topographic rings; a multi-ringed basin could be described as a massive impact crater, surrounded by circular chains of mountains resembling rings on a bull's-eye. A multi-ringed basin may have an area of many thousands of square kilometres.



The structure of multi-ring basins

In adjacent rings, the ratio of the diameters approximates :1 ≈ 1.41 to 1.

Formation

To start, a peak ring crater has

 one peak-ring, i.e., a  crater rim, which is generally circular, and
 a mountainous region which surrounds the basin center.

A multi-ringed basin has an important difference, which is multiple peak-rings.

In extremely large collisions, following the impact the rebound of the surface can obliterate any trace of the initial impact point. Usually a peak ring crater has a high structure with a terrace, and has slump structures inside of it. In 2016, research brought forward new theories about the lunar mare called Mare Orientale on Earth's Moon, as to how it formed.

Multi-ring basins are some of the largest, oldest, rarest and least understood of impact craters. There are various theories to explain the formation of multi-ringed basis, however there is currently no consensus.

Examples

 In Mexico Chicxulub crater has a sufficient area to have been a multi-ringed basin,
 On the largest moon of Jupiter, Ganymede, Anubis Crater is a multi-ringed basin,
 On the moon of Saturn, Dione, Evander is a multi-ringed basin,
 On Mercury, Caloris Basin, surrounded by Caloris Montes is a multi-ringed basin,
 On Jupiter's moon Callisto, Valhalla is a multi-ringed basin.

See also

 
 
 
 
 
 
 
 
  book from Lunar and Planetary Institute - comprehensive reference on impact crater science

References

External links and references

 Transition from complex craters to multi‐ringed basins on terrestrial planetary bodies: Scale‐dependent role of the expanding melt cavity and progressive interaction with the displaced zone
 Retracing the origins of a massive, multi-ring crater

Impact craters
Impact geology